The National Science Foundation Ice Core Facility (NSF-ICF), known as the National Ice Core Laboratory (NICL) before 2018, is the primary repository for ice cores collected by the United States. The facility is located at the Denver Federal Center in Lakewood, Colorado, and is managed by the United States Geological Survey (USGS). Funding for the facility comes from the National Science Foundation Office of Polar Programs, while scientific research is managed by the University of New Hampshire. NSF-ICF currently houses ~22,000 m of ice cores collected from Greenland and Antarctica, including the GISP2, Siple Dome, and portions of the Vostok cores. It is the lead facility for management of the West Antarctic Ice Sheet (WAIS) Divide ice core.

In addition to providing a large storage facility, maintained at -35 °C, NSF-ICF also has one of the largest sub-zero research and sample preparation spaces in the world. NSF-ICF is responsible for distributing samples of ice cores in their collection to researchers around the world, following approved research proposals.

In addition to the primary archive freezer, NSF-ICF has a nonsterile exam room, as well as a FED-STD-209E class-100 HEPA-filtered, cold cleanroom held at -24 °C that scientists use when examining ice cores.

Scientists generally use the exam rooms to cut samples from the ice cores, and then ship the samples back to their home institution for analysis. Very little analysis of the ice cores occurs at NSF-ICF itself.

In addition to research activities, NSF-ICF also participates in public outreach and gives ~100 tours per year.

See also
Frozen zoo, a similar concept, but for animals
Svalbard Global Seed Vault
Amphibian Ark
Coral reef organizations
Rosetta Project

External links
Ice Core Laboratory homepage
Map showing location of NICL within Denver Federal Complex

References 

United States Geological Survey
Buildings and structures in Jefferson County, Colorado
Laboratories in the United States
Glaciology of the United States